The National Hospital Organization Okayama Medical Center is a medical centre in Okayama, Japan. It is where innovations have taken place in Pulmonary Arterial Hypertension.

References

External links 
 National Hospital Organization Okayama Medical Center website

Hospitals in Japan